Bagaha Lok Sabha constituency was a Lok Sabha (parliamentary) constituency in Bihar state in eastern India till 2008.

Assembly segments
Bagaha Lok Sabha constituency comprised six Vidhan Sabha (legislative assembly) segments, which were:
 Valmiki Nagar
 Ramnagar
 Shikarpur
 Sikta
 Lauriya

Members of Parliament

See also
 West Champaran district
 List of former constituencies of the Lok Sabha

Notes

Politics of West Champaran district
Former Lok Sabha constituencies of Bihar
Former constituencies of the Lok Sabha
2008 disestablishments in India
Constituencies disestablished in 2008